Roinghites is genus of ammonoid cephalopod belonging to the Cheiloceratidae family. Species belonging to this genus lived in late Devonian (Famennian).

Species and distribution
 Roinghites aktubensis Bogoslovskii, 1960: ca 370.0 - 367.6 mya of Kazakhstan (South Urals). Originally named as Raymondiceras aktubense
 Roinghites bottkei Korn, 2002: ca 367.6 - 366.8 mya of Germany (Rhenish mountains). Type species of genus.

References

Goniatitida genera
Cheiloceratidae
Late Devonian ammonites
Fossils of Kazakhstan
Ammonites of Asia
Famennian life
Famennian genus first appearances
Famennian genus extinctions